= 1st Independent Division of Shandong Provincial Military District =

1st Independent Division of Shandong Provincial Military District (1966–76) Independent Division of Shandong Provincial Military District (1976–81)
- Active: 1966.6 – 1981.10
- Country: People's Republic of China
- Branch: People's Liberation Army
- Type: Division
- Role: Infantry

1st Independent Division of Shandong Provincial Military District (Chinese: 山东省军区独立第1师) was formed in August 1966. The division was composed of three infantry regiments (1st to 3rd) and an artillery regiment.

In October 1976 the division was renamed as Independent Division of Shandong Provincial Military District (Chinese: 山东省军区独立师) following 2nd Independent Division of Shandong Provincial Military District's disbandment.

The division was disbanded in October 1981.
